= Zonal Welfare Council =

Indian non-governmental organisation

- Formation: 1990
- Type: Not for profit
- Purpose: Village development, Women empowerment, Childhood education and health care, Children's welfare
- Headquarters: Kolkata
- Location: India
- Region served: India
- Website: www.zonalwelfarecouncil.org

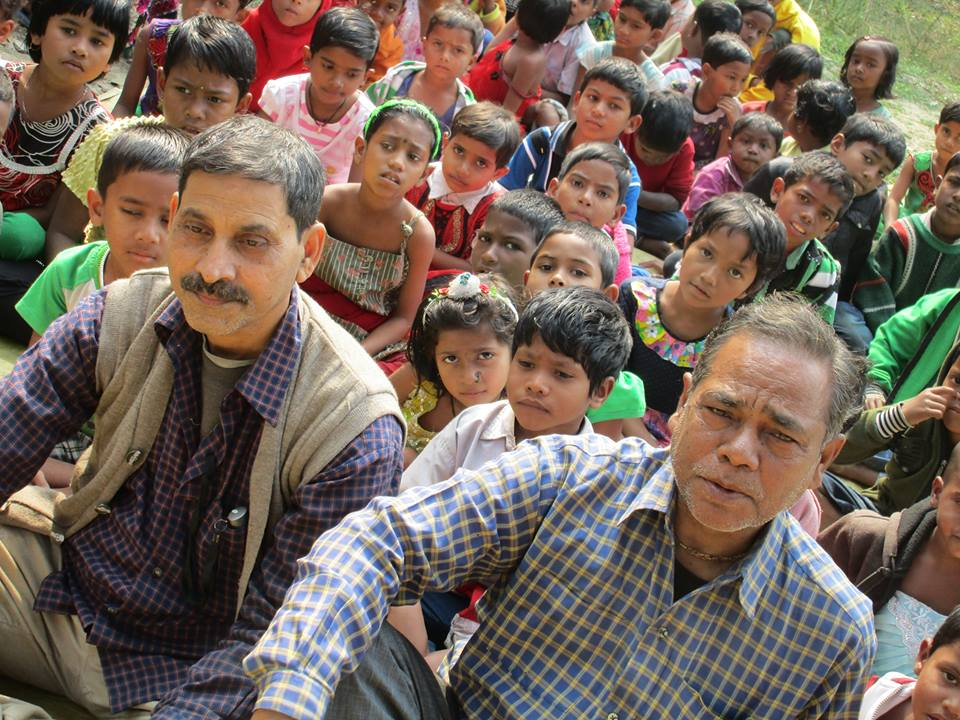

Zonal Welfare Council is a grassroots NGO based in Kolkata, in the West Bengal state of India. Founded by Shri. Pranab Kumar Chakraborty in 1990, it is currently headed by CEO, Akashdeep Chakraborty.

Zonal Welfare Council works mainly in natural resource development and sustainability, village development, women empowerment, early childhood education and health care, continuing education, and children's welfare.

Zonal Welfare Council's main working area is Kolkata and South 24 Parganas districts, Zonal Welfare Council is maintaining and running a free orphanage in South 24 Parganas.

Zonal Welfare Council, partnered with LetzChange Foundation, Global Stop TB Team, and Human and Child Trafficking movement in India.

Zonal Welfare Council provides shelter, food, clothing and nutrition to the street children and orphans.
